Boso of Arles may refer to two counts of Arles:

Boso, Margrave of Tuscany, who was Boso I of Arles (r. 934–936)
Boso II of Arles (r. 949–967)